Theretra tryoni is a moth of the  family Sphingidae. It is known from Papua New Guinea, Queensland and north-eastern New South Wales.

The wingspan is about 70 mm. Adults are plain brown, with a few faint dark dots.

The larvae feed on Alocasia macrorrhizos, Colocasia esculenta and Zantedeschia aethiopica. Early instars are green with a pair of blue-green eyespots on each side of the front of the abdomen, and a pale tail spike.  Later instars vary in colour from green to orange or even brown, with two equally sized eye spots on each side, on the first and second abdominal segments. They only have a short dorsal horn. Pupation takes place in a long and thin, mottled brown pupa.

References

Theretra
Moths described in 1891